Last Century Modern is the third studio album by Japanese music producer Towa Tei, released on July 28, 1999 by East West Records. It peaked at number 20 on the Oricon Albums Chart. The album was released in the United States on May 23, 2000 by Elektra Records.

Critical reception

Exclaim!s Denise Benson described Last Century Modern as a "wonderfully eclectic" album that "solidifies [Tei's] reputation for creating fanciful, risky pop music."

Track listing

Charts

References

External links
 

1999 albums
Towa Tei albums
Albums recorded at Chung King Studios
East West Records albums
Elektra Records albums